Desmostachys is a genus of flowering plants belonging to the family Icacinaceae.

Its native range is Western Indian Ocean.

Species:

Desmostachys longipes 
Desmostachys planchonianus

References

Icacinaceae
Asterid genera